Sparta Airport  is a military airport located  south of Sparta, a municipality in the regional unit of Laconia in Greece.

Facilities

Nearest airports
The three nearest airports are:

References

External links
 

Airports in Greece
Buildings and structures in Laconia
Transport infrastructure in Peloponnese (region)